Vera Fusek (born Vera Vuseck, 20 May 1932 – 8 August 2021) was a Czechoslovak-born British actress.

Life and career 
Fusek was born in Prague and attended a Swiss finishing school from around 1946. In 1948, her family left Czechoslovakia and settled in Great Britain. After graduating from RADA, she travelled to New York City in 1955 hoping to work on Broadway, but her period in American theatre was brief and she returned to London.

She was known for her work in films such as Treasures of the Snow (1980) and The Great Van Robbery (1959). She also appeared on many TV shows such as Doctor Who including Frontier in Space. 

Fusek died in Suffolk, England in August 2021 at the age of 89.

References

External links
 

1932 births
2021 deaths
People from Prague
British people of Czech descent
British actresses
Alumni of RADA